HMS Endeavour may refer to one of the following ships:

In the Royal Navy
 , a 36-gun ship purchased in 1652 and sold in 1656
, a 4-gun bomb vessel purchased in 1694 and sold in 1696
, a fire ship purchased in 1694 and sold in 1696
, a storeship hoy purchased in 1694 and sold in 1705
, a storeship launched in 1708 and sold in 1713
, a cutter purchased in 1763 and sold in 1771
, a 14-gun sloop, purchased in 1763 and foundered in 1780 in a hurricane off Jamaica
, originally Earl of Pembroke, a 10-gun bark purchased in 1768; known as Endeavour Bark to distinguish her from her contemporaries listed above; was commanded by Lieutenant James Cook in his first voyage of exploration to the Pacific, 1768–1771; sold in 1775
 , a sailing replica of Cook's Endeavour
, a schooner purchased in 1775 and sold in 1782
, another schooner purchased in 1782; there may have been other brigs or schooners obtained in the West Indies during this period, as the name was retained for several replacement vessels
, a survey ship launched in 1912, used as a depot ship from 1940, and sold in 1946

In the Royal New Zealand Navy
 , which served as the Antarctic support vessel from 1956 to 1962
 , which served as the Antarctic support vessel HMNZS Endeavour  from 1962 to 1971
 , a fleet tanker commissioned in 1988, and decommissioned in 2017

See also
 Apollo 15 Command Module, the first NASA vessel named in honor of James Cook's HM Bark Endeavour
 Space Shuttle Endeavour, the second NASA vessel named in honor of James Cook's HM Bark Endeavour
 Crew Dragon Endeavour, the third spacecraft named in honor of James Cook's HM Bark Endeavour
 , several ships of the name
 Four Starfleet vessels were named USS Endeavour in various Star Trek series
 Endeavour (disambiguation)

Royal Navy ship names